Lyrical King (From the Boogie Down Bronx), from 1987, is the debut album of hip-hop emcee T La Rock. It was released after the EP He's Incredible, and none of the tracks from that record were on the original release of the album. Singles released were "Back to Burn," "Tudy Fruity Judy," "It's Time to Chill," and, in the UK, "Big Beat in London." Kurtis Mantronik produced several tracks, and Greg Nice of Nice & Smooth contributed human beat boxing. When the album was rereleased in digital form by Traffic Entertainment Group in 2006, two of the tracks from He's Incredible and two non-album tracks produced by Kurtis Mantronik were added. In addition, the Rick Rubin-produced classic "It's Yours," which was originally released on a different label, was also included because of its common ownership in the present day.

Cover
On the cover can be seen T La Rock wearing an Adidas Laser track top with the logo of the French Football Federation. Actually, T La Rock won this suit from a streetball game against Akhenaton, one of the emcees of the French hip hop group IAM, when the group came to New York City in 1986.

Track listing
Original 1987 album:
Lyrical King
Back to Burn
Tudy Fruity Judy
Having Fun
Three Minutes of Beat Box
Bust These Lyrics
This Beat Kicks
Big Beat in London
It's Time to Chill
Live Drummin' with the Country Boy

2006 additions:
It's Yours (12-Inch Radio Mix)
Breakdown (12-Inch Version)
He's Incredible (12-Inch Version)
Breaking Bells (12-Inch Version)
Bass Machine (12-Inch Version)

Additional personnel
 Editors: Chep Nuñez, Omar Santana, Carlos Barios
 Mastering engineer: Howie Weinberg

Later samples
Samples of "It's Yours" can be heard in the following songs and in countless others.
"Paul Revere" by the Beastie Boys from the album "Licensed to Ill"
"Louder Than a Bomb" by Public Enemy from the album It Takes a Nation of Millions to Hold Us Back
"The World Is Yours" by Nas from the album Illmatic
"Rewind" by Nas from the album Stillmatic
"Fumbling Over Words That Rhyme" by Edan from the album Beauty and the Beat
"Party People" and "Can You Party" by Royal House from its self-titled album
"Interloper" by Slipknot from the album Slipknot

References

1987 debut albums
Fresh Records (US) albums
East Coast hip hop albums
Albums produced by Kurtis Mantronik